Medal of Poglavnik Ante Pavelić for Bravery is founded as a "visible sign of decoration for acts of personal bravery in combat". Poglavnik of Croatia has awarded with this medal officers, NCOs and soldiers of Croatian Armed Forces who showed personal bravery in combat. It was possible that medal be awarded to members of foreign armed forces, and those members were needed to be involved in combat along with Croatian soldiers. Medal for bravery had four grades:

Golden medal for bravery
It was worn on unusual created ribbon which hung from the second upper button. Holder of the Golden medal for bravery had right on title "Knight" ("Vitez"). Golden medal for bravery was awarded to only seven persons and five of them was awarded posthumous. Also, two Golden medals for bravery were awarded to flags of two Croatian units.

Great silver medal for bravery 
It was worn on triangle ribbon which hung on the left chest.

Croatian citizens, which have been awarded with Great silver or Golden bravery medal had monthly allowance. 
There was also Small silver medal and Bronze medal of Poglavnik Ante Pavelić for bravery which were massively awarded.

Creator of this medal is famous Croatian sculptor Ivo Kerdić.

Recipients

Golden Medal for bravery
Nine medals were awarded:
Artillery Lance Sergeant Marijan Banovac
Ustaša Captain Mijo Babić
Ustaša Colonel Jure Francetić
Infantry Major Juraj Bobinac
Ustaša Major Krunoslav Devčić
Air Force Lieutenant Cvitan Galić
General Eduard Bona-Bunić
Kladanj Battalion
369th Croatian Reinforced Infantry Regiment

Sources
Hrvatska odlikovanja (mr. sc. Stjepan Adanić, general-bojnik Krešimir Kašpar, prof. Boris Prister, prof. Ivan Ružić)

Orders, decorations, and medals of the Independent State of Croatia
Awards established in 1941
1941 establishments in Croatia
Awards disestablished in 1945
1945 disestablishments in Croatia